Thomas, Tom or Tommy Robinson may refer to:

Artists
 Thomas Robinson (composer) (c. 1560 – after 1609), English composer and music teacher
 Thomas Heath Robinson (1869–1954), British book illustrator

Politicians
 Thomas Robinson, 1st Baron Grantham (c. 1695–1770), English diplomat and politician
 Thomas Robinson, 2nd Baron Grantham (1738–1786), English politician and statesman
 Thomas Robinson Jr. (1800–1843), United States Representative from Delaware
 Thomas Robinson (Gloucester MP) (1827–1897), English corn merchant and Liberal politician, MP for Gloucester 1880–95
 Thomas H. Robinson (Maryland politician) (1859–1930), American politician and lawyer
 Sir Thomas Robinson (Stretford MP) (1864–1953), English politician, MP for Stretford, 1918–1931
 Thomas J. B. Robinson (1868–1958), United States Representative from Iowa
 Tommy F. Robinson (born 1942), American politician from Arkansas
 Thomas Robinson (Northern Ireland politician) (born 1950 or 1951), Unionist politician from Northern Ireland

Sportsmen
 Thomas Robinson (cricketer) (1837–1910), English cricketer
 Thomas Robinson (footballer) (1893–1951), English footballer
 Tommy Robinson (footballer) (1909–1982), English footballer of the 1930s
 Tom Robinson (athlete) (1937–2012), Bahamian sprinter
 Thomas Robinson (basketball) (born 1991), basketball player
 Tom Robinson (rugby union) (born 1994), New Zealand rugby union player

Other people
 Sir Thomas Robinson, 1st Baronet (1703–1777), English architect and collector; Governor of Barbados, 1742–1747
 Thomas Robinson (1749–1813), English cleric in Leicester
 Thomas Robinson (orientalist) (1790–1873), English cleric and academic
 Thomas Romney Robinson (1792–1882), Irish astronomer and physicist
 Thomas Robinson (Medal of Honor) (1837–1915), United States Navy sailor
 Sir Thomas B. Robinson (1853–1939), Australian businessman and diplomat
 Tom Robinson (born 1950), English singer-songwriter and broadcaster
 Tom Robinson (priest), Church of England military archdeacon
 Tommy Robinson (activist) (born 1982), pseudonym used by Stephen Yaxley-Lennon, former leader of the English Defence League
 Tommy Robinson (hooligan), British football hooligan
 Tommy Robinson, British actor who played Albert Briggs in the 1980s children's programme Jonny Briggs

Fictional characters 
 Tom Robinson (Oz), character on the HBO series Oz
 Tom Robinson, a character in the novel To Kill a Mockingbird

See also
Thomas Robbins (disambiguation)
Thomas Robson (disambiguation)
Tommy Robinson (disambiguation)
Tommy Robison (born 1961), American football player
Tommy Robson (1944-2020), English footballer